Togolok is an archaeological site in the Murghab Delta, Turkmenistan, located about 10–15 km south of Gonur (or about 40 km north of Mary, Turkmenistan). Togolok 21 is an Indo-Iranian temple and fortress dated to the first half of the 2nd millennium BC, belonging to the late phase of the Bactria–Margiana Archaeological Complex (BMAC). Togolok 1 area has also been excavated.

According to the Encyclopedia of Indo-European Culture (page 495), the Togolok temple contained rooms where traces of ephedra and hemp were found along with implements for the preparation of a hallucinogenic beverage (later known as soma in India and as haoma in Iran).

Togolok Depe
The name 'Togolok' is also applied to another much older site in Turkmenistan known as 'Togolok Depe'. This settlement started in the Neolithic during the Jeitun period around 7000 BC. It is located in the Kopet-Dag foothills near the ancient Jeitun settlement. The site has been excavated and published in 1964 in Russian.

References

Viktor Sarianidi, Le complexe cultuel de Togolok 21 en Margiane", Arts Asiatiques 41 (1986), 5–21.
Viktor Sarianidi, "Togolok 21, an Indo-Iranian Temple in the Karakum", Bulletin of the Asia Institute 4 (1990), 159–165.
Victor Sarianidi, Margiana and Soma-Haoma, Electronic Journal of Vedic Studies (EJVS)  9.1c (5 May 2003).
Fredrik Talmage Hiebert, Origins of the Bronze Age Oasis Civilization in Central Asia, American School of Prehistoric Research Bulletins 42 (2004).
M. Cattani et al., The Murghab Delta in Central Asia 1990-2001: GIS from a Research Resource to a Reasoning Tool for the Study of Settlement Change in Long-Term Fluctuations in: M. Doerr (ed.), The Digital Heritage of Archaeology'' (2002).

Archaeological sites in Turkmenistan
Former populated places in Turkmenistan
Mary Region
Murghab basin
Indo-Iranian archaeological sites